Leo Bernard Gorcey (June 3, 1917– June 2, 1969) was an American stage and film actor, famous for portraying the leader of a group of hooligans known variously as the Dead End Kids, the East Side Kids and, as adults, The Bowery Boys. Gorcey was famous for his use of malapropisms, such as "I depreciate it!" instead of "I appreciate it!"

Early years
Gorcey was born in New York City on June 3, 1917, the son of Josephine (née Condon), an Irish Catholic immigrant, and Bernard Gorcey, a Russian Jewish immigrant. Both were vaudevillian actors of short stature. Their son would reach  in adulthood.

Film career
In the 1930s, Gorcey's father lived apart from the family while working in theater and film. When he returned in 1935, he and Leo's younger brother David Gorcey persuaded Leo to audition for a small part in the play Dead End. Leo had just lost a job as a plumber's apprentice and wished to emulate his father's modest success. The Gorcey boys were cast in small roles as two members of the East 53rd Place Gang (originally dubbed the "2nd Avenue Boys") in the play Dead End by Sidney Kingsley. Charles Duncan, originally cast as Spit, left the play, and Gorcey, his understudy, was promoted. Gorcey created the stage persona of a quarrelsome guttersnipe whose greatest joy was to make trouble.

In 1937, Samuel Goldwyn made the popular play into a film of the same name and transported the six rowdy young men to Hollywood. Gorcey became one of the busiest actors in Hollywood during the following 20 years, starring in seven Dead End Kids films between 1937 and 1939, 21 East Side Kids films between 1940 and 1945, and 41 Bowery Boys films between 1946 and 1955.

The earlier films presented Gorcey in variations of his Dead End character Spit, a sneering tough guy meeting anyone's challenge with a wisecracking remark. In the early 1940s, as the dramatic films shifted to roughneck comedy, Gorcey embellished his dialogue with malapropisms, always delivered in a thick Brooklyn accent. "A clever deduction" would be mangled by Gorcey as "a clever seduction"; "I reiterate"  became "I regurgitate"; "optical illusion" came across as "optical delusion"; and "I should see an optometrist" was rendered as "I should see an ichthyologist." A studio press release reported that Gorcey spent 30 minutes a day studying a dictionary: "He has made something of a career for himself as an actor by the use of words no one else has ever heard of, and by the misuse or mispronunciation of others." 

In 1944, Gorcey took a recurring role on the Pabst Blue Ribbon Town radio show, starring Groucho Marx. He also had a small role in a 1948 film, the comedy So This Is New York, starring radio comedians Henry Morgan and Arnold Stang, which was Gorcey's last appearance as a straight character actor.

In 1945 Sam Katzman, producer of the East Side Kids series, flatly refused to meet Gorcey's demand of double his usual salary. Gorcey walked out on Katzman, and Katzman discontinued the series. Gorcey turned to Dead End teammate Bobby Jordan, who suggested a meeting with Jordan's agent, Jan Grippo. The series became The Bowery Boys, with Gorcey holding a 40% financial share, and Grippo as producer. Gorcey brought aboard his father, Bernard Gorcey, to appear as Louie Dumbrowski, the panicky owner of a sweet shop where the boys gathered. Leo recruited his brother David to play one of the gang members. 

The series was immediately successful, and Gorcey starred in four Bowery Boys films per year through 1955. That year, his father died as a result of injuries from an automobile accident. Gorcey, devastated, began abusing alcohol and lost a great deal of weight. When he trashed a film set in an intoxicated rage, the studio refused to grant him a pay raise that he had demanded, so he parted ways with the Bowery Boys and was replaced in the last seven films by Stanley Clements. However, Gorcey's brother David remained with the series until it ended in late 1957.

During the 1960s, Gorcey did very little acting. He had a bit part in the 1963 comedy It's a Mad, Mad, Mad, Mad World and he appeared with old sidekick Huntz Hall in a pair of low-budget films, Second Fiddle to a Steel Guitar in 1966 and The Phynx in 1970. Gorcey also made an appearance in a television commercial for a 1969 Pontiac model.

Autobiography
In 1967 Gorcey self-published an autobiography, An Original Dead End Kid Presents: Dead End Yells, Wedding Bells, Cockle Shells, and Dizzy Spells, which was limited to 1,000 copies. It was reprinted in 2004.

Personal life
In May 1939, Gorcey married 15-year-old dancer Kay Marvis, who appeared in four of his Monogram movies. They divorced in 1944, and Marvis later wed Groucho Marx.

Gorcey married actress Evalene Bankston in October 1945, but they divorced two years later. He was arrested for firing a gun at his wife when she entered his home in Van Nuys, California, but was acquitted of the charge in 1948.

In February 1949, Gorcey married actress Amelita Ward, with whom he had appeared in Clancy Street Boys and Smugglers' Cove. The marriage produced two children, including Leo Gorcey Jr., but the couple were divorced in February 1956. Later that year, Gorcey married Brandy Davis. They had a daughter, Brandy Gorcey Ziesemer, but divorced in 1962. Gorcey married Mary Gannon on July 12, 1968, his wife until his death.

Death
Gorcey, a lifetime alcoholic, died of liver failure on June 2, 1969, one day short of his 52nd birthday. He is buried at Molinos Cemetery in Los Molinos, California.

Legacy
Gorcey's image was to appear on the cover of the Beatles' 1967 album Sgt. Pepper's Lonely Hearts Club Band, but because he requested a fee, he was removed.

Me and the Dead End Kid, a book about Gorcey written by his son Leo Jr., was published in 2003.  In 2017, a third book on his life appeared, Leo Gorcey's Fractured World by Jim Manago, which included an examination of Gorcey's use of malapropisms in the Bowery Boys films.

Filmography

Film

Television

References

External links

 
 
 

1917 births
1969 deaths
20th-century American male actors
American male film actors
American people of Irish descent
American people of Russian-Jewish descent
Jewish American male actors
Deaths from liver failure
20th-century American Jews